The 82nd 24 Hours of Le Mans was an 24-hour automobile endurance racing event for teams of three drivers entering Le Mans Prototype and Le Mans Grand Touring Endurance cars held from 11 to 15 June 2014 at the Circuit de la Sarthe close to Le Mans, France. It was the 82nd running of the event, as organized by the Automobile Club de l'Ouest (ACO) since . The race was the third round and the premier event of the 2014 FIA World Endurance Championship, with half of the race's fifty-five entries contesting the championship. Approximately 263,000 spectators attended the event, the largest crowd since .

This victory was Audi's thirteenth since the company debuted at the race in 1999. The Audi team took the lead after a Toyota TS040 Hybrid came to a stop after leading half the race distance, but were challenged by Porsche when two Audi cars required turbocharger replacements. The second of Tom Kristensen, Marc Gené and Lucas di Grassi finished in second place, three laps behind the race winners, while Anthony Davidson, Sébastien Buemi and Nicolas Lapierre's No. 8 Toyota recovered from an accident in the first hour to finish in third place.

The (Le Mans Prototype 1-Lightweight) LMP1-L category was won by the Rebellion Racing Rebellion-Toyota of Nick Heidfeld, Mathias Beche, and Nico Prost, the sole finisher in the class. The Le Mans Prototype 2 (LMP2) class finished with the Jota Sport Zytek-Nissan of Simon Dolan, Oliver Turvey, and Harry Tincknell ahead of the TDS Racing Ligier-Nissan by less than a lap's distance. The AF Corse team fielding a Ferrari 458 Italia GT2 won the Le Mans Grand Touring Endurance Professional (LMGTE Pro) category with drivers Gianmaria Bruni, Giancarlo Fisichella, and Toni Vilander, while the Le Mans Grand Touring Endurance Amateur (LMGTE Am) category was won by Aston Martin Racing's trio of Danish drivers: David Heinemeier Hansson, Kristian Poulsen, and Nicki Thiim.

The result meant Davidson, Lapierre and Buemi remained the Drivers' Championship leaders with 80 points while Fässler, Tréluyer and Lotterer's victory enabled them to move into second on 60 points and di Grassi and Kristensen remained in third place but a further six points behind. Mathias Beche, Nicolas Prost and Nick Heidfeld remained in fourth position on 42 points and Gené's second-place finish moved him to fifth place. Toyota remained the leaders of the Manufacturers' Championship, but their advantage over Audi was now a single point while Porsche maintained third position with five races left in the season.

Schedule and pre-championship standings
The 2014 Le Mans schedule was moved forward one week to avoid conflicts with other major motorsports series. It was the 82nd running of the event, and the third of eight scheduled rounds of the 2014 FIA World Endurance Championship. Before the race Toyota drivers Anthony Davidson, Sébastien Buemi and Nicolas Lapierre led the Drivers' Championship with 50 points, 16 ahead of their teammates Alexander Wurz, Stéphane Sarrazin and Kazuki Nakajima and a further 16 in front of Loïc Duval, Lucas di Grassi and Tom Kristensen. Mathias Beche, Nicolas Prost and Nick Heidfeld were fourth on 18 points and Timo Bernhard, Brendon Hartley and Mark Webber stood in fifth place with 15.5 points. Toyota were leading the Manufacturers' Championship with 84 points, 48 ahead of their rival Porsche in second; the third-placed Manufacturer Audi had scored 28 points. Toyota had so far dominated the championship, winning the season's previous two races. Wurz, Sarrazin and Nakajima along with Duval, di Grassi and Kristensen had finished in second once and Bernhard, Hartley, Webber along with Wurz, Sarrazin and Nakajima had both secured third-place podium finishes.

Circuit and regulation changes

Following the death of Allan Simonsen during the 2013 race, the ACO announced improvements to several sections of the circuit. Tertre Rouge was re-profiled and new barriers and tire walls were added at the corner's exit onto the Mulsanne Straight. Run-off areas in the Corvette corners were expanded, and Tecpro barriers were added behind the tire walls at the start of the Porsche corners. Large kerbs were added to the paved run-off at the second Ford chicane to deter cars from cutting the corner.

A new safety system was implemented, which allowed for the intervention of safety vehicles on a particular section of the circuit without the need for neutralising the entire race with safety cars. The system, termed a slow zone, requires cars to slow and maintain a speed of  within a specific zone. Speeds within the zones were monitored by GPS systems that were required on every car. In conjunction with the slow zone procedure an onboard marshalling system warned drivers of the location of slow zones. New regulations required rookies, as well as drivers who have not competed at Le Mans in the past five years, to participate in a half-day simulator training course. The course includes examples of night and wet racing at Le Mans, as well as the new safety car and slow zone procedures.

Entries

Automatic invitations
Automatic entry invitations were earned by teams that won their class in the previous running of the 24 Hours of Le Mans, or have won Le Mans-based series such as the American Le Mans Series (ALMS), European Le Mans Series (ELMS) and Asian Le Mans Series (ASLMS). Some second-place finishers were also granted automatic invitations in certain series. As with the 2013 race, the ALMS was given two designated entries rather than entries for each class. All current FIA World Endurance Championship (FIA WEC) full-season entries also automatically earned invitations. As automatic invitations were granted to teams, the teams were allowed to change their cars from the previous year to the next, but are not allowed to change their category. However, automatic invitations in the two GTE categories were able to be swapped between the two based on the driver line-ups chosen by these teams.

On 20 December 2013, the ACO published its initial list of automatic invitations. Muscle Milk Pickett Racing and Team Endurance Challenge did not take up their automatic entries; Risi Competizione also turned down its invitation, but later submitted a request for another car and was granted a reserve entry.

Garage 56

The ACO continued the Garage 56 concept, started in 2012. Garage 56 allows a 56th entry to the race, using the rigours of the 24 Hours of Le Mans to test new technology. The ACO announced during 2013 that the Nissan Motor Company's Nismo division had been granted the Garage 56 entry for 2014.

Nissan unveiled the car, known as the ZEOD RC, during the 2013 24 Hours of Le Mans weekend. The ZEOD RC was designed by Ben Bowlby, who created the 2012 Garage 56 entry DeltaWing with backing from Nissan. The ZEOD RC utilized a hybrid electric drivetrain with lithium ion battery packs in a chassis similar in design to the DeltaWing. The car featured a turbocharged three-cylinder internal combustion engine and two electric drive motors. Nissan planned to attempt a full lap of the Circuit de la Sarthe under all-electric power, a goal achieved during the pre-race warm-up session.

Entry list

In conjunction with the announcement of entries for the 2014 FIA WEC and the 2014 ELMS, the ACO announced the full list of invitations for Le Mans, plus ten reserves. In addition to the 31 guaranteed entries from the WEC, thirteen entries came from the ELMS, five from the IMSA SportsCar Championship, and two from the ASLMS, while the rest of the field was filled with one-off entries competing only at Le Mans.

Following the publication of the invitations, several teams withdrew their entries. SRT Motorsports announced that its Vipers would be withdrawn, citing concentration on the United SportsCar Championship, and bringing the manufacturers in the Le Mans Grand Touring Endurance Professional (LMGTE Pro) category down to four. JMW Motorsports' and Team Taisan's Ferrari cars were promoted to the race entry as a result. On 28 April 2014, the ACO released a revised entry list that confirmed the withdrawal of Millennium Racing's two entries, Craft Racing, and two additional Aston Martin Racing entries. Larbre Compétition, Caterham Racing, Pegasus Racing and second entries of IMSA Performance Matmut and Prospeed Competition were promoted from the reserves to the race entry.

Lotus withdrew its new LMP1-L class prototype due to a delay in completion of the car, leaving only Rebellion Racing cars in the category. Millennium Racing, which had previously withdrawn due to a delay in funding, had one entry reinstated. A week later Strakka Racing withdrew its Strakka Dome S103 after an accident in testing damaged the car, which had been planned to debut in the LMP2 category. Krohn Racing, who had initially withdrawn its joint entry with Risi Competizione from the reserve list, replaced the Strakka. The day before the start of scrutineering, Millennium Racing was unable to secure its funding and was forced to withdraw for the second time. No replacement was found.

Testing and practice
A test day was held on 1 June, two weeks prior to the race, and allowed but did not require all entrants for the race to participate in eight hours of track time divided into two sessions. Krohn Racing did not attend the test due to lack of preparation, while Prospeed Competition's second car was also not entered. Millennium Racing had its race entry plus a second car entered for the test but did not arrive. AF Corse brought an additional Ferrari to allow more testing for drivers, bringing the total cars for the day to 54. Toyota set the pace of the day with a three minutes and 23.014 seconds lap recorded by Buemi in the second session, followed by Nakajima in the No. 7 Toyota in second. The No. 3 Audi of Marco Bonanomi was within a second of the top time. The fastest Porsche of Neel Jani was over a second and a half behind Buemi's lap. Roman Rusinov led the LMP2 class for G-Drive Racing with a three minutes and 37.795 seconds lap time ahead of Karun Chandhok's No. 48 Murphy Prototypes and Signatech Alpine. The LMGTE Pro category was led by Frédéric Makowiecki's Porsche with a three minutes and 57.260 seconds time, while the team's second car was damaged beyond repair early in the session after becoming airborne in the gravel traps of the Ford chicane. Paolo Ruberti's 8 Star Motorsports Ferrari was the fastest in LMGTE Am, and the second fastest amongst all LMGTE runners, with a three minutes and 57.403 seconds lap. After the test several prototype teams, including all Audi, Porsche, and Toyota cars participated in an unofficial test on the shorter Bugatti Circuit the following day to ensure car components were working efficiently before the race.

Official practice was held on 11 June with the full 54-car field on track for four hours. Toyota led from the start once again, with Davidson claiming the fastest time of the session with a three minutes and 23.652 seconds lap, just ahead of the No. 2 Audi. Porsche's fastest laps were nearly three seconds off the pace. Early in the session, the No. 1 Audi of Loïc Duval spun and became airborne in the Porsche Curves, impacting catch fencing above the barriers and destroying the car. Duval was able to climb from the car but was not cleared for the rest of the week while Audi was forced to bring in a spare chassis to replace the vehicle. He was replaced by Jota Sport driver Marc Gené with Oliver Turvey taking over the Spaniard's seat at the British team. OAK Racing's Ligier JS P2, making its racing debut, led the LMP2 category with a three minutes and 40.611 seconds lap time. In LMGTE, an Am class car led the field with Nicki Thiim's Aston Martin recording a three minutes and 57.015 seconds lap time, ahead of the LMGTE Pro AF Corse Ferrari by thirteen thousandths of a second. The experimental Nissan ZEOD RC was the only car not to set a lap time in the session after suffering mechanical failures on its first lap. A second stoppage was necessitated after Erik Maris crashed into the barrier at the first Mulsanne chicane and the session ended early when Frankie Montecalvo impacted the wall at the second chicane and debris was scattered across the track.

Qualifying
The first qualifying session began late Wednesday night under clear weather, as Porsche led the time sheets early on with a flying lap from Jani in the No. 14 entry, followed by Hartley's three minutes and 23.157 seconds time a few laps later to top the session. The two Toyota cars stood two seconds back by the end of the session, although the No. 7 car suffered an oil leak and stopped on the side of the circuit, while the two participating Audi R18 e-tron quattro cars were three seconds adrift of the Porsche vehicles. Olivier Pla carried OAK Racing's Morgan to provisional pole in LMP2 with a time of three minutes 38.843 seconds ahead of the Signatech Alpine and KCMG Oreca. Nicolas Minassian in the No. 37 SMP Racing Oreca-Nissan caused a red flag for half an hour early in the session after crashing in the Porsche Curves. The Pro class of LMGTE was led by Gianmaria Bruni's AF Corse Ferrari, setting a pace of three minutes and 54.754 seconds. Aston Martin, Porsche, and Corvette all had cars within two seconds of the Ferrari. Aston Martin's second entry, driven by Fernando Rees, crashed at the Porsche Curves, forcing the session to be ended half an hour earlier than planned in order to repair the barriers. The Aston Martin would later be withdrawn from the race due to the damage to the car. At the premature end of the session, Andrea Bertolini's SMP Ferrari was at the top of the timing charts for LMGTE Am with a three minutes and 56.787 seconds lap time, followed by the No. 61 AF Corse Ferrari and Dempsey Porsche.

Thursday's first qualifying session saw more stoppages for crashes. James Calado crashed his AF Corse Ferrari in the Porsche Curves, necessitating a half-hour red flag. This was followed by the No. 1 Audi, making some of its first laps since its accident on Wednesday, spinning at Indianapolis corner and damaging the car's bodywork. While driver di Grassi attempted to return to the pit lane he swerved in front of Leo Roussel's Pegasus Morgan, causing the LMP2 car to dart off the track and crash at the pit entrance. At the same time, Bret Curtis in the No. 79 Prospeed Porsche spun at the entrance to the Dunlop Chicane and impacted the wall, knocking Curtis unconscious. Curtis was transported to the local hospital for a check-up and was not cleared for the remainder of the race meeting. Following clean-up of the circuit qualifying resumed with fifteen minutes left in the session, and improvements were made by nearly every hybrid and non-hybrid car in LMP1. Kazuki Nakajima improved provisional pole position with a three minutes and 22.589 seconds lap, followed by the Porsche entries of Romain Dumas and Bernhard. The fastest Audi was fourth after a lap from Oliver Jarvis. Tristan Gommendy gave the débuting Ligier of TDS Racing provisional pole in LMP2 after displacing the Murphy Oreca on the last lap of the session, setting a time of three minutes and 38.094 seconds. In LMGTE Pro, Corvette led the session but did not improve on AF Corse's lap time from the first qualification session. Similarly the No. 61 AF Corse Ferrari came within two-tenths of a second of besting SMP's lead time in LMGTE Am.

With the multiple stoppages in qualifying, the third session was expanded by half an hour in order to give teams more time on the circuit. Fifteen minutes into the session Nakajima set a new fastest time of three minutes and 21.789 seconds and would hold the top of the time charts to take Toyota's first pole position at Le Mans since . Dumas improved the No. 14 Porsche's time to sit alongside the Toyota on the front row of the grid. Audi was not able to improve on their times from the second qualifying session, and settled for fifth, sixth, and seventh places on the grid. The No. 12 Rebellion, driven by Beche, won out over its sister car in the non-hybrid LMP1-L category but eight seconds off the overall pole position. In LMP2, OAK Racing and the Jota Zytek traded provisional pole before Gommendy reclaimed the top spot for TDS Racing and Ligier with a three minutes and 37.609 seconds lap time. Bruni improved on his own provisional pole time in LMGTE Pro with a three minutes and 53.700 seconds, extending the class lead by over a second from the No. 73 Corvette in second and sole Aston Martin in third. Sam Bird earned AF Corse a second pole position by improving LMGTE Am's top time by two seconds with a three minutes and 54.665 seconds and setting the second fastest time of all LMGTE cars combined. Aston Martin's two entries were second and third in the class, yet a full second behind the Ferrari. The Nissan ZEOD RC of Lucas Ordóñez, after earlier woes in the week, set a three minutes and 50.185 seconds lap time to place 27th overall in qualifying. The slow zone procedure was used for the first time in the third qualifying session, after Montecalvo spun the 8 Star Ferrari into the gravel in the Porsche Curves. The slow zone was required once more to finish the session after Chandhok crashed the Murphy Oreca at Indianapolis. Both slow zones prevented qualifying times from being improved in the final hour of the session.

Post-qualifying 
Prospeed nominated Sebastien Crubile as a replacement for Curtis, but the ACO did not allow him to participate due to a lack of laps taken under night conditions. The team elected continue as a two-driver operation, but were forced to switch to the LMGTE Pro category due to no longer meeting the LMGTE Am driver ranking requirements. Calado was injured from his second qualifying session crash and was not cleared to participate in the race and was replaced by Pierre Kaffer.

Qualifying results
Pole position winners in each class are indicated in bold and by a  The fastest time set by each entry is denoted in gray.

Warm-up
The cars took to the track on Saturday morning for a 45-minute warm-up session in dry and sunny weather. The No. 8 Toyota driven by Buemi set the fastest time with a late lap of three minutes and 23.731 seconds. The sister Toyota of Lapierre was third-fastest having been separated from his teammate by Lotterer who recorded the second-quickest overall time. The other two Audi entrants of Filipe Albuquerque and Marcel Fässler rounded out the top five. The fastest LMP2 lap was set by Pierre Thiriet with a time of three minutes and 40.263 seconds. Jan Magnussen, driving the No. 73 Chevrolet Corvette, was the quickest driver in LMGTE Pro with the No. 95 Aston Martin driven by Thiim the fastest of the LMGTE Am drivers. Maurizio Mediani made contact with Shinji Nakano's car but both vehicles sustained only minor damage. Mika Salo crashed his AF Corse Ferrari in a collision with the barriers at the entry to the Porsche Curves, possibly caused by a rear puncture, but the car was not heavily damaged.

Race
The weather at the start was dry and sunny. Approximately 243,000 spectators attended the event, the largest crowd since . The race began with a rolling start at 15:00 Central European Summer Time (UTC+02:00), with two-time Formula One World Champion Fernando Alonso having the honour of waving the French Tricolour to start the race. The 54-car field was led by Wurz's Toyota, who maintained the position for most of the opening hours, followed by Lapierre in the second Toyota and the trio of Audi cars driven by Lotterer, Bonanomi and Kristensen; the two Porsche entries of Bernhard and Jani fell back from the leaders. The experimental Nissan ZEOD RC driven by Wolfgang Reip came to a rest on the side of the circuit at the Porsche Curves on the sixth lap after suffering a failure related to its gearbox, and became the first retirement of the race after a request by the team to recover the car was rejected by the ACO. Meanwhile, Lapierre fell from second place after spinning exiting a Mulsanne chicane and bringing out the race's first slow zone procedure.

Rain fell across parts of the circuit in the second hour of the race and several cars were caught out by the change in conditions. The KCMG Oreca-Nissan driven by Richard Bradley, which had been trading the LMP2 lead with Jota Sport, hydroplaned into the first Mulsanne chicane and impacted the tire barriers heavily, while further up the Mulsanne Straight several contenders in multiple classes were involved in a heavy accident. A group of LMGTE cars as well as the No. 3 Audi were slow on the course when they were approached by the No. 8 Toyota of Lapierre at a high speed. Aquaplaning under braking, Lapierre spun amongst the group of cars and impacted the barriers head on. This was followed by Bird in the LMGTE Am-leading AF Corse Ferrari who drove into the rear of Bonanomi. The accident led to a safety car intervention, during which Lapierre was able to limp the Toyota back to the pit lane for repairs that lasted for nearly an hour. Bonanomi and Bird were unable to get their cars moving again and retired. Bradley was able to drive back to the pit lane for repairs and kept second place in LMP2.

Rain returned to the circuit only fifteen minutes after the race resumed green flag conditions and more chaos ensued; Chandhok of Murphy Prototypes and Michael Munemann of Greaves Motorsport collected one another while spinning exiting Tertre Rouge corner, bringing out the safety cars for the second time. As the rain tapered off and racing resumed once more, the remaining Toyota and pursuing Porsche cars were now on different pit stop sequences, allowing Bernhard and later Hartley to briefly take the overall race lead before Sarrazin in the No. 7 reclaimed the top spot by the fourth hour. Further down the field changes in lead were also happening in other categories. Wet weather tyre strategy from the Dempsey-Proton Porsche failed to pay off as the No. 98 Aston Martin took command in LMGTE Am from the slower Porsche. After the damaged KCMG car relinquished the lead in LMP2, Franck Mailleux's No. 34 Race Performance Oreca and Signatech driver Paul-Loup Chatin traded off the category lead before later being joined by the No. 35 OAK Ligier driven by Alex Brundle. The LMGTE Pro lead became a multi-car battle between representatives of each of the four manufacturers, with the lead sometimes changing several times per lap. The Porsche 919 Hybrid also suffered its first major problems as the No. 14 of Marc Lieb went to the garage with fuel pressure problems, dropping the car to 51st place before it recovered to sixth.

As night fell on the circuit, Toyota's lead extended to over a minute from the two remaining Audi entrants, while the OAK Ligier took over the LMP2 lead and ran away to nearly three minutes over the duelling Race Performance Oreca and Signatech Alpine. LMGTE Pro continued to be a close battle between Giancarlo Fisichella in the No. 51 Ferrari, Darren Turner's No. 97 Aston Martin, and No. 74 Corvette driven by Richard Westbrook, with the trio following one another nose to tail for a multitude of laps. The second Corvette dropped off the leading pace after problems with the car's air jack system required a lengthy pit stop. The No. 98 and No. 95 Aston Martin vehicles continued to hold sway over the LMGTE Am class, but around midnight Pedro Lamy relinquished the lead the No. 98 car had held for 86 consecutive laps when he came to the pit lane with smoke from the bonnet as the power steering system on the car failed. The No. 1 Audi of Kristensen was forced to the garage to replace failed fuel injectors after the race passed half distance, while Lieb Porsche's No. 14 car was forced to return to the pit lane on solely electrical power after suffering a second fuel pressure problem. As Nakajima drove the No. 7 Toyota into its ninth hour in the race lead, the car lost drive shortly after the Arnage corner and came to a stop alongside the barriers. An FIA-mandated piece of monitoring equipment had failed within the car and melted a wiring loom and was not able to be repaired by Nakajima, forcing Toyota to abandon the former race-leading car. The No. 2 Audi became the new leader ahead of the No. 20 Porsche and the recovering No. 1 Audi by three laps.

Over an hour after taking the race lead, Fässler, driving the No. 2 Audi, was forced to replace a failing turbocharger, sitting idle for twenty minutes and falling to third. Audi's No. 1 car took over the top spot after passing the No. 20 Porsche and the ailing No. 2, eventually extending its lead to one lap over the Porsche. Further down the field the No. 74 Corvette was forced to drop out of the lead battle in LMGTE Pro as the alternator belt on the car failed, requiring a visit to the garage that lost the car three laps. The No. 72 SMP Racing Ferrari of Viktor Shaytar had a crash in the Porsche Curves which damaged the safety barriers alongside the track and forced the retirement of the Ferrari. The safety car was deployed for two laps to move necessary equipment to the damaged area for repairs, while a slow zone was used after the safety car period for half an hour while the repairs were undertaken. After green flag racing resumed, the OAK Ligier of Mark Shulzhitskiy leading LMP2 was forced to the garage with engine and brake issues, eventually resuming at a slower pace. The second place TDS Ligier driven by Gommendy was also hindered after a suspension failure required repairs, and Simon Dolan's Jota Zytek improved to within a lap of the top two in class. The No. 97 Aston Martin driven by Bruno Senna, after continuing its close battle with Bruni in the No. 51 Ferrari, succumbed to the same power steering failure that had hit the No. 98 sister car. Ferrari now enjoyed a two lap lead over Richard Lietz in the No. 92 Porsche who inherited second in class.

Nearly 21 hours into the race, Kristensen's No. 1 Audi slowed on course on several laps. After eventually returning to the garage Audi were forced to perform their second turbocharger replacement of the race as the No. 1 was hampered by the same issue that had stopped the No. 2's lead. This promoted Bernhard in the No. 20 Porsche to the race lead with the No. 2 Audi driven by Lotterer only a minute and a half behind the leader. Porsche's lead lasted only an hour though as it too slowed on the course suffering from a broken anti-roll bar and was forced to the garage where it was eventually abandoned. The No. 14 Porsche of Lieb came to the garage half an hour later with gearbox issues after slowing at Mulsanne corner but returned to the race in the final half-hour. The shake-up in LMP1 promoted the No. 2 Audi to the race lead, three laps ahead of di Grassi's No. 1 Audi and followed by Davidson's No. 8 Toyota, still recovering from its accident in the opening hours of the race. The attrition amongst LMP1 cars also allowed the No. 12 Rebellion Racing, the sole remaining LMP1-L car in the race, into fourth place overall. The ailing OAK Ligier of Brundle was also forced to abandon the LMP2 lead after being caught by the faster TDS Ligier of Gommendy and Harry Tincknell's Jota Zytek, before eventually having a lengthy stop for more work on the troubled engine which dropped them from contention.

The No. 2 Audi, driven by Fässler, Benoît Tréluyer, and Lotterer, was able to maintain the race lead without trouble for the final two hours of the race, taking the trio's third race win in four years, and Audi's thirteenth overall. Porsche was able to repair the No. 14 car enough to return it to the track for the final lap, settling for eleventh place overall. The battle in LMP2 continued into the last hour, as the Jota Zytek was able to overhaul the TDS Ligier and hold on for the class win and fifth place overall. The win was the first for Jota Sport and its drivers Dolan, Turvey, and Tincknell. Nissan powered the top five finishers in the class. In the LMGTE Pro category, the No. 73 Corvette was able to come back against the No. 92 Porsche to claim second in class, but no one was able to challenge the lead of the AF Corse Ferrari for the remainder of the race. The No. 95 Aston Martin, which had been Allan Simonsen's entry when he was killed in an accident at Le Mans the previous year, was undaunted in LMGTE Am and maintained the first-place position it had held for 205 consecutive laps. Proton Competition came in second in the class, two laps adrift of the Aston Martin. There were eight lead changes in the race; four cars reached the front of the field. The No. 7 Toyota led three times for a total of 207 laps, more than any other car. The No. 2 Audi led twice in the race for a total of 73 laps.

Post-race 
The top three finishers of each category appeared on the podium to collect their trophies and in a later press conference. All three of the No. 2 Audi drivers felt their turbocharger problem would have cost them the victory, with Lotterer saying, "When we had the turbo problem we were very disappointed because it's impossible to come back from that. We were a bit unlucky, but at Le Mans you never know what is going to happen and the team motivated me again – they did a great job." Fässler added the team attempted to pressure Toyota but they were unable to catch the Japanese manufacturer: "But this time everyone had problems. We had to be flat out and have no penalties – it isn't easy to do that when you are pushing." Tréluyer stated that winning Le Mans was "emotional" and praised the engineers strategy. He felt their approach was like their  victory: "We concentrated on our own race and took the car through until morning. It was the car which had the least bad luck that won." Kristensen stated he was not unhappy to finish in second and that while his team would have liked to have had their "little fairy tale" it was still a good result. Di Grassi said it had been "a difficult race" for his team but hoped to return to Le Mans in the future while Gené revealed that did not expect a strong result but that second was "like a fairytale for me."

Buemi and Davidson were disappointed to achieve a third-place podium finish with Davidson saying Toyota had to learn from their mistake and make progress. Both drivers added that their focus would be on the championship. Lapierre accepted that his early race crash affected his team's ambitions of winning the race, stating he was unable to see anything because of low visibility, and did not expect to get the car back to the pit lane with the heavy damage it sustained: "We crossed our fingers that the car would hold together to the end, and after this we can be pleased with what we accomplished." Wolfgang Ullrich, the head of Audi Motorsport, expressed his respect for Porsche, saying the German company and Toyota were strong competitors and Ullrich held a belief that Audi would succeed despite of strenuous prerequisites for the season. He stated the event was "of the kind you can only experience at Le Mans" with the deciding factors being that the Audi R18 e-tron quattro drove consistently fast for the entire duration of the race and said the victory was placed among the German company's greatest wins because of the constant changing factors for all the competing teams.

The result meant Davidson, Lapierre and Wurz remained at the top of the Drivers' Championship with 80 points while Fässler, Tréluyer and Lotterer's victory enabled them to move into second on 60 points and di Grassi and Kristensen were still in third place but a further six points behind. Beche, Prost and Heidfeld remained in fourth position on 42 points and Gené's second-place finish allowed him to round out the top five with 36 points. Toyota remained the leaders of the Manufacturers' Championship on 115 points, but their advantage over Audi had been reduced to one point while Porsche maintained third position with five races left in the season.

Race result
Class winners are denoted in bold and by the symbol .

Standings after the race

 Note: Only the top five positions are included for the Drivers' Championship standings.

Footnotes

References

24 Hours of Le Mans races
Le Mans
Le Mans
24 Hours of Le Mans